Hiss is a surname. Notable people with the surname include:

 Alger Hiss (1904–1996), U.S. State Department employee and an accused Soviet spy
 Anna Hiss (1893–1979), 20th-Century American professor of physical education
 August Hiss, Swiss footballer
 Arlene Hiss (born 1941), American former race car driver and schoolteacher
 Donald Hiss (1906–1989), younger brother of Alger Hiss
 Mike Hiss (born 1941), former driver in the USAC Championship Car series
 Priscilla Hiss (1903–1984), a 20th-century American teacher and book editor
 Yehuda Hiss (born 1946), chief pathologist at the Abu Kabir Institute of Forensic Medicine